The Sigma 10mm f/2.8 EX DC fisheye is a photographic lens manufactured by Sigma Corporation. It is a diagonal fisheye lens.  Unlike most fisheye lenses, this lens is designed for digital SLR cameras that do not have a full 36x24mm sensor.  This results in a much greater fisheye effect than is possible when a full-frame fisheye lens is used with a smaller sensor.
The projection type of this lens is equidistant 

This lens is available in Canon, Nikon, and Sigma, Pentax, and Sony mounts.

Gallery

See also
List of Nikon compatible lenses with integrated autofocus-motor
 Sigma 4.5mm f/2.8 EX DC Circular Fisheye HSM lens

References

External links
 An in-depth Review of the Sigma 10mm F2.8 lens

010mm f/2.8 EX DC Fisheye HSM
Fisheye lenses
Camera lenses introduced in 2007